Divergent thinking is a thought process or method used to generate creative ideas by exploring many possible solutions.  It typically occurs in a spontaneous, free-flowing, "non-linear" manner, such that many ideas are generated in an emergent cognitive fashion. Many possible solutions are explored in a short amount of time, and unexpected connections are drawn. Following divergent thinking, ideas and information are organized and structured using convergent thinking, which follows a particular set of logical steps to arrive at one solution, which in some cases is a "correct" solution.

The psychologist J.P. Guilford first coined the terms convergent thinking and divergent thinking in 1956.

Activities

Activities which promote divergent thinking include creating lists of questions, setting aside time for thinking and meditation, brainstorming, subject mapping, bubble mapping, keeping a journal, playing tabletop role-playing games, creating artwork, and free writing. In free writing, a person will focus on one particular topic and write non-stop about it for a short period of time, in a stream of consciousness fashion.

Playfulness

Parallels have been drawn between playfulness in kindergarten-aged children and divergent thinking.  In a study documented by Lieberman, the relationship between these two traits was examined, with playfulness being "conceptualized and operationally defined in terms of five traits: physical, social and cognitive spontaneity; manifest joy; and sense of humour".   The author noted that during the study, while observing the children's behaviour at play, they "noted individual differences in spontaneity, overtones of joy, and sense of humour that imply a relationship between the foregoing qualities and some of the factors found in the intellectual structure of creative adults and adolescents".   This study highlighted the link between behaviours of divergent thinking, or creativity, in playfulness during childhood and those displayed in later years, in creative adolescents and adults.

Future research opportunities in this area could explore a longitudinal study of kindergarten-aged children and the development or evolution of divergent thinking abilities throughout adolescence, into adulthood, in order to substantiate the link drawn between playfulness and divergent thinking in later life.  This long-term study would help parents and teachers identify this behaviour (or lack thereof) in children, specifically at an age when it can be reinforced if already displayed, or supported if not yet displayed.

Effects of positive and negative mood

In a study at the University of Bergen, Norway, the effects of positive and negative mood on divergent-thinking were examined.   Nearly two hundred art and psychology students participated, first by measuring their moods with an adjective checklist before performing the required tasks.  The results showed a clear distinction in performance between those with a self-reported positive versus negative mood: 
 
A series of related studies suggested a link between positive mood and the promotion of cognitive flexibility.  In a 1990 study by Murray, Sujan, Hirt and Sujan, this hypothesis was examined more closely and "found positive mood participants were able to see relations between concepts”, as well as demonstrating advanced abilities "in distinguishing the differences between concepts".  This group of researchers drew a parallel between "their findings and creative problem solving by arguing that participants in a positive mood are better able both to differentiate between and to integrate unusual and diverse information".  This shows that their subjects are at a distinct cognitive advantage when performing divergent thinking-related tasks in an elevated mood. Further research could take this topic one step further to explore effective strategies to improve divergent thinking when in a negative mood, for example how to move beyond "optimizing strategies" into "satisficing strategies" rather than focus on "the quality of their ideas", in order to generate more ideas and creative solutions.

Effects of sleep deprivation

While little research has been conducted on the impact of sleep deprivation on divergent thinking, one study by J.A. Horne illustrated that even when motivation to perform well is maintained, sleep can still impact divergent thinking performance.  In this study, twelve subjects were deprived of sleep for thirty-two hours, while a control group of twelve others maintained normal sleep routine. Subjects' performance on both a word fluency task and a challenging nonverbal planning test was "significantly impaired by sleep loss", even when the factor of personal motivation to perform well was controlled. This study showed that even "one night of sleep loss can affect divergent thinking”, which "contrasts with the outcome for convergent thinking tasks, which are more resilient to short-term sleep loss". Research on sleep deprivation and divergent thinking could be further explored on a biological or chemical level, to identify the reason why cognitive functioning, as it relates to divergent thinking, is impacted by lack of sleep and if there is a difference in its impact if subjects are deprived of REM versus non-REM sleep.

See also

References

External links
 Changing Education Paradigms by RSA Animate on YouTube
 Fuel Creativity in the Classroom With Divergent Thinking on Edutopia
 What Type of Thinker Are You? at Psychology Today

Problem solving skills